Human rights education (HRE) is the learning process that seeks to build up knowledge, values, and proficiency in the rights that each person is entitled to. This education teaches students to examine their own experiences from a point of view that enables them to integrate these concepts into their values, decision-making, and daily situations. According to Amnesty International, HRE is a way to empower people, training them so their skills and behaviors will promote dignity and equality within their communities, societies, and throughout the world.

The "National Economics and Social Rights Initiative" stated the importance of Non-Discrimination in HRE. Governments must see to it that it is exercised without bias to race, gender, color, religion, language, national or social origin, political or personal opinion, birth, or any status. All students, parents, and communities possess the right to take part in decisions affecting their respective schools and the right to education.

History
The "Universal Declaration of Human Rights" is acknowledged as a landmark document in human rights history. It states that basic human rights require protection and that every person is entitled to a certain base amount of rights and freedoms through it. This is believed to be the most influential document used to determine what qualifies as human rights and how to implement these ideas and rights into everyday life. It was translated into more than 500 languages worldwide and was drafted by representatives from various countries and regions with varying legal and cultural experiences. The declaration was adopted by the United Nations General Assembly on December 10th, 1948, making this annual Human Rights Day ever since. To this day, the 30 article compilation stands and states that this document is, "a common standard of achievement for all peoples and all nations".

Education on these ideals was addressed in 1953 with the UNESCO Associated Schools Program, which served as an "initial attempt to teach human rights in formal school settings". The emphasis on educating the next generations progressed in 1995 with the beginning of the United Nations' Decade for HRE. The first formal request though came about in UNESCO's 1974 article "Recommendation concerning Education for International Understanding, Cooperation and Peace, and Education relating to Human Rights and Fundamental Freedoms." The participants of the International Congress on the Teaching of Humans Rights eventually met in 1978 to form a specific definition of what would be required in formal curriculum. The aims that Congress agreed on included the encouragement of tolerant attitudes with a focus on respect, providing knowledge of human rights in the context of national and international dimensions as well as their implementations, and finally developing awareness of human rights translating into reality whether social or political on national and international levels.

Human Rights Education became an official international concern after the World Conference on Human Rights in 1993. This conference brought the issue of formally educating to many countries,' and eventually the United Nations, attention. In 1995, the UN approved the Decade for HRE, which reformed the aims of the application once again. Since this development by the UN, the incorporation of HRE into formal school curriculum has been developed and diversified with the assistance of nongovernmental organizations, intergovernmental organizations, and individuals dedicated to spreading the topic through formal education.

The Asia-Pacific Center for Education for International Understanding (APCEIU) and the United Nations Academic Impact mutually organized the 2018 United Nations Global Citizenship Education Seminar at the UN Headquarters in New York City.  These seminars help progress HRE by bringing people together to form new ideas and concepts to improve the movement. Advocates for HRE believe it is crucial because it imparts and spreads out the human rights vocabulary and provides students with the ability to take a critical approach towards human rights.

Progressing development
The demand for HRE continued to grow globally in 2022 as the United Nations Global Compact, in cooperation with the Principles for Responsible Management Education, invite[s] companies to sign the open letter calling on academic institutions to integrate business and human rights topics into their curriculum." This was begun because these groups believe, "academic institutions are well-positioned to prepare future business leaders to manage the human rights impacts of their companies." 

The Office of the High Commissioner for Human Rights (OHCHR) continues to promote HRE by supporting national and local initiatives for HRE within the context of its Technical Cooperation Programs and through the ACT Project which subsidizes the grassroots projects. The ACT or Assisting Communities Together Project is the collaboration between the OHCHR and the United Nations Development Program (UNDP) to make grants available for civil society organizations that are implementing human rights activities in local communities. The OHCHR also takes care of coordinating the World Program for Human Rights Education which aims to, "promote a common understanding of basic principles and methodologies of human rights education, to provide a concrete framework for action and to strengthen partnerships and cooperation from the international level down to the grassroots." This is a more adaptable program, unlike the decade-long one. It focuses on a different issue every few years and tries to strengthen HRE in a different way.

Education
The OHCHR developed human rights education training materials and resource tools such as the Database on human rights education and the Training, the Resource Collection on Human Rights Education and Training, and the web section on the Universal Declaration of Human Rights. 

HRE as also started to be offered in the school curriculum. For example, linked subjects like History, Politics and Citizenship incorporated human rights training, but there are also specialized courses, such as "Human Rights", offered as part of the International Baccalaureate Diploma program for high school students. In order to pass the course students are required to study for two years, take a final examination and produce coursework. As part of their diploma program, students may also choose to write their Extended Essay on Human Rights in the form of a 4000-word research paper. (The IB Human Rights syllabus that includes the assessment criteria, as well as the guide for the Human Rights Extended Essay can be acquired from the International Baccalaureate Organization, but here is a small portion: IB Human Rights )

Some cities in the world have adopted a municipal law to stimulate successfully the HRE in the public schools, as the example of the Municipal Plan of HRE of the city of São Paulo (Decreto Nº 57.503, DE 6 DE Dezembro de 2016), in Brazil.

Models
There are four models that emerged to help categorize HRE in formal and informal education sectors: values and awareness, accountability, transformation, and socioecoethical. To help guide HRE in the right direction, they set up "goals, target groups and other practical elements of educational programming, such as content and methodologies."

1.	Values and awareness The Values and Awareness Model focuses on transmitting "basic knowledge of human rights issues and fostering its integration into public values." This model is what people commonly think of when human rights are concerned with the target audience, the general public, understanding global human rights and more cultural-based matters. Another way of phrasing it is to say that "this model is focused on the knowledge of human rights issues and its integration into public values."

2.	Accountability
The Accountability Model is associated with the legal and political approach to human rights in which the learners that the model targets are already involved via professional roles.  The model is incorporated by means of training and networking, covering topics such as court cases, codes of ethics, and how to deal with the media. This model is "linked with the individual and his or her professional role" and is, "oriented towards the infusion of HRE within the training of government personnel so as to help ensure that they respect human rights in carrying out their responsibilities."

3.	Transformational 
This model of education focuses on the psychological and sociological aspects of human rights.  The topics towards which this model is effective are those including vulnerable populations and people with personal experiences effected by the topic, such as women and minorities. The model aims to empower the individual, such as those victims of abuse and trauma. The model is geared towards recognizing the abuse of human rights but is also committed to preventing these abuses. The transformational model, "highlights the empowerment of disadvantaged groups for organizing collectively, not only to carry out human rights activism but to carry forward social change more generally." It is, "more accurately described as promoting a goal of social change, incorporating both “activism” including collective action and community development as well as undertaking individual actions to reduce violations in one’s personal life and immediate environment."

4. Munir's socioecoethical model of human rights education 
This model is Munir Moosa Sadruddin's integrative approach to the applicability of HRE for teachers, educators and learners. It applies to formal, informal and non-formal educational settings in developed, developing and third world countries. 

In Munir's viewpoint, human right education practices should be categorized into formal, informal, and non-formal education. Informal education is the source of learning human rights for children and females belonging to the marginalized communities, who do not have access to formal or non-formal education, whereas formal and non-formal education is the medium of learning human rights for everyone who has access to education informal educational settings. HRE is of utmost importance for all of them. Unless we accommodate HRE into informal education settings, parallel with formal and non-formal education, it is likely that these young minds will get inclined towards violence and radicalization.

HRE should begin by assessing the sociocultural context and political will. What are the ideological practices of a particular country? Is there any social acceptance of all HR values? Which HR values are sensitive to discuss? What are the cultural intakes on HR values? Further, the educational constraints imposed by the fundamentalists in many parts of the world have perhaps discouraged policymakers from disseminating HR values. In addition, many developing and third world states strong oppose western human rights laws and values and consider it as a political weapon to harm the cultural value system. Therefore it is pertinent to highlight the sociocultural context, the acceptable values, and the values that are in clash.

The next stage is understanding and assessing the dynamism of the ecological environment, i.e., convergence and divergence of human rights. It assesses the risks and opportunities of HRE at multiple levels, i.e., individual's wellbeing, community, and policy-making level.

The third stage is the ethical stage. Moral reasoning and ethical ownership are at its disposition.

The fourth stage is assessing general knowledge and attitude towards HR. As an alternate, ethnography may work. After passing the initial phases, decisions about HRE content should be made. 

The foremost important thing is to add local content knowledge on HRE and filter the global HR knowledge that best fits the sociocultural context of that particular country. Adaption may work but all the resources should be socio-culturally fit. It should begin with the local and shift towards the global. Next, self-empowerment skills such as critical thinking, rationally based decision making, situation analysis, social and voluntary skills, digital literacy, peacebuilding, negotiation, etc. Next comes values, that should be negotiated with the cultural context. Finally, teaching HRE alone does not ensure that there will be peace and unity in the world. The actual litmus test occurs in society through the reflection of attitudes and actions in a sustainable way that is often ignored.

United Nations
The United Nations High Commissioner for the Promotion and Protection of all Human Rights functions as coordinator of the UN Education and Public Information Programs in the area of human rights.

The United Nations General Assembly has proclaimed it as central to the achievement of the rights enshrined in the Universal Declaration of Human Rights (UDHR):

Article 26.2 of the UDHR states the role of educators in achieving the social order called for by the declaration:

Article 29 of the Convention on the Rights of the Child requires states to ensure that children are enabled to develop a respect for their own cultural identity, language and values and for the culture, language and values of others.

The importance of human rights was reaffirmed by the United Nations in the 1993 Vienna Declaration and Programme of Action:

As a result of the Vienna Declaration the decade from 1995 to 2004 was declared the UN Decade of Human Rights Education.

UNESCO has a responsibility to promote human rights education, and was a key organizer of the UN's Decade for Human Rights Education. UNESCO attempts to promote human rights education through:

 Development of national and local capacities for human rights education, through its co-operation in development projects and programmes at national and sub-regional levels.
 Elaboration of learning materials and publications and their translation and adaptation in national and local languages.
 Advocacy and Networking Activities.

Following the Decade of Human Rights Education, on 10 December 2004, the General Assembly proclaimed the World Programme for Human Rights Education, and ongoing project to advance the implementation of human rights education programmes in all sectors:

Organizations

The Arab Organization for Human Rights is an independent Arab non-governmental organization based in Tunisia. It was founded in 1989 at the initiative of the Arab Organization for Human Rights, the Arab Lawyers Union, and the Tunisian League for Human Rights and with the support of the United Nations Centre for Human Rights. The Institute received the UNESCO International Award for Human Rights Education for the year 1992.
Goals :
The Arab Institute for Human Rights aims to promote a culture of civil, political, economic, social and cultural human rights, as enshrined in the Universal Declaration of Human Rights and international conventions, and to strengthen the values of democracy and citizenship.

Organizations such as Indian Institute of Human Rights, Amnesty International and Human Rights Education Associates (HREA) promote human rights education with their programmes, believing "that learning about human rights is the first step toward respecting, promoting and defending those rights".

Amnesty International defines Human Rights Education as a "deliberate, participatory practice aimed at empowering individuals, groups and communities through fostering knowledge, skills and attitudes consistent with internationally recognized human rights principles" and explains the goal of Human Rights Education is to "empower yourself and others to develop the skills and attitudes that promote equality, dignity and respect in your community, society and worldwide."

Human Rights organizations aim to protect human rights on different levels some being more specific to geographical areas, others are based on governmental influences, others are nonprofit and education based, while others specifically aim to protect a certain group of individuals.  The following are organizations with brief descriptions of their aims, targeted audiences, and affiliations.

According to the Office of the High Commissioner for Human Rights (OHCHR), each submission whether private or public, governmental or NGO is evaluated with regards to the following context: appropriateness, effectiveness, originality, ease of use, adaptability, sustainability, approach, and inclusiveness.  Each characteristic of which is detailed in the article Human Rights Education in the School Systems of Europe, Central Asia, and North America: A Compendium of Good Practice.

African Centre on Democracy and Human Rights Studies

African Commission on Human and Peoples' Rights
This commission is in charge of monitoring the protection of humans' rights and ensuring the protection and promotion of these rights.  It also is charged with the responsibility of interpreting the African Charter on Human and Peoples' Rights.  This commission is limited to the continent of Africa and the countries within it.

Amnesty International
One of the largest human rights organizations, Amnesty International includes 2.2 million members from over 150 countries. The organization concerns research as well as action in order to prevent and end human rights abuses. They are also focused on seeking justice for the violations which have already been committed.

The Asian Human Rights Commission
The goals of the AHRC are "to protect and promote human rights by monitoring, investigation, and advocating and taking solidarity actions".  This commission is limited to the continent of Asia and the countries within it.

The Children's Defense Fund attempts to create policies and programs to ensure equality to all children. They work towards decreasing the child poverty rate as well as protecting children from abuse and neglect. The members of the CDF act as advocates for children to help ensure they are treated equally and have the right to care and education in the future.

Commissioner for Human Rights, Council of Europe
The commission is an independent institution which promotes awareness of human rights in the forty-seven Council of Europe Member States.  Since it has such a broad area of concern its purpose is more to encourage reform and it takes "wider initiates on the basis of reliable information regarding human rights violations" rather than acting on individual complaints.

European Union Ombudsman
This organization exists to investigate grievances about the maladministration that occurs within the institutions and bodies of the European Union.

Facing History and Ourselves
This US developed online module organization aims to provide information investigating "how societies attempt to rebuild, repair, and bring a sense of justice and security to their citizenry in the aftermath of conflict and genocide". As the topics about which this particular organization are concerned with are more mature and sensitive than others, this program is designed for students in middle, high school, and at the university level. The module has specifically designed its program based on four case studies: Germany, Rwanda, Northern Ireland, and South Africa. This resource has proven helpful in order to study how individuals, organizations, and governments have fostered "stability, security, reconciliation, coexistence and/or justice", all of which are explained in further detail on the organization's website, www.facinghistory.org.

United Nations Human Rights Council
This council includes 47 states and is charged with the responsibility of promoting and protecting human rights on the international level.  The council has a specific Advisory committee which assesses each situation as well as an outlined Complaint Procedure which must be followed in order for an individual or organization to bring a violation to the attention of the council.

Human Rights Watch
Functioning as another global organization, the Human Rights Watch protects human rights by investigating claims, holding abusers accountable of their actions, and monitoring and challenging governments to make sure that they are using their power to end abusive practices efficiently and to the fullest.

John Humphrey Centre for Peace and Human Rights  The John Humphrey Centre exists to promote the principles of the Universal Declaration of Peace and Human Rights through human rights education and learning. The organization develops curriculum, conducts training, works with children and youth, and fosters public discourse on matters of human rights.

National Association for the Advancement of Color People (NAACP)
"The mission of the NAACP is to ensure the political, educational, social, and economic quality of rights of all persons and to eliminate racial hatred and racial discrimination".

Inter-African Committee on Traditional Practices Affecting the Health of Women and Children

Namibian Legal Assistance Centre

People in Need
People in Need developed a project called One World in Schools: Human Rights Documentary Films in which they provide teachers with films, over 260 of which are available, and other multimedia tools to assist in their education of human rights around the world. The purpose of the videos is to teach the students, specifically primary and secondary school aged students in the Czech Republic, the values of tolerance and respect by way of audio-visual stimulation.

Office of Democratic Institutions and Human Rights of the Organization for Security and Co-Operation in Europe (OSCE)
The OSCE comprises 56 states from participating countries in Europe, Central Asia, and North America.  The main focuses of the OSCE include the freedom of movement and religion.  They specifically monitor torture prevention and human trafficking.

Office of the United Nations High Commissioner for Human Rights
Unlike many other organizations this office is not limited to a specific geographic area, but instead works to protection all human rights for all peoples.  This organization also states within its mission statement it aims to "help empower people to realize their rights" versus many organizations which state that they wish to promote knowledge etc.

Office of the United Nations High Commissioner for Refugees
This organization has a specific target audience of refugees which it hopes to protect from violations of their rights. They aim to ensure that any person can seek a safe refuge in some place while remaining to have the option to return home, integrate at a new locale or resettle in a third location.

The Simon Wiesenthal Center is a human rights organization which focuses on the international Jewish community. The Center addresses anti-Semitism including the hate and terrorism associated with it.  By teaming up with Israel and cooperating closely with the Jewish religious community, the Center defends the safety of Jews worldwide and serves to educate others about Jewish history including but limited to the Holocaust.

Tostan
Tostan is an international non-profit organization headquartered in Dakar, Senegal, operating in six countries across West Africa. Tostan's mission is to empower African communities to bring about sustainable development and positive social transformation based on respect for human rights. At the core of Tostan's work is its 30-month Community Empowerment Program (CEP), which provides participatory human rights education in local languages to adults and adolescents who have not attended formal schools, primarily in remote regions.

United Nations Education, Scientific and Cultural Organization (UNESCO) "UNESCO's goal is to build peace in the minds of men".  The organization hopes to act as a catalyst for "regional, national, and international action in human rights".

US State Department Bureau of Democracy, Human Rights and Labor Confined to the United States, the Department strives to take action against abuse of human rights.  Although they are not particularly involved with the investigations, they are the enforcers and have partnered with many other organizations committed to protecting human rights.

Uses in the 21st century
 As a strategy for development (Clarence Dias)
 As empowerment (Garth Meintjes)
 As a way of change for women's rights (Dorota Gierycz)
 As a legal prospective and for law enforcement (Edy Kaufman)

See also
 Children's rights education
 Democratic education
 Humanitarian education
 Peace education
 Educational technology
 Education for justice
Education for sustainable development
Progressive education

References

Sources
 Murphy, F.; Ruane, B. (2003). "Amnesty International and human rights education".

External links
 University of Leeds Centre for Citizenship and Human Rights Education
 University of San Francisco Human Rights Education Program
 Human Rights Courses
 DARE Network Democracy and Human Rights Education in Europe

Human rights
International law
Global citizenship
Education by subject